Joe Fiorito is a Canadian journalist and author.

Early life
Fiorito was born June 22, 1948 in Fort William, Ontario. His father was a mailman and a musician. His mother was a waitress. He had three brothers. He wrote about his family life in the acclaimed memoir, "The Closer We Are To Dying".

Career

After working for several years in community development, he joined the CBC in 1980 as the manager of CFFB Radio in Frobisher Bay, now Iqaluit. He then worked as a CBC Radio producer in Regina from 1985 to 1991. While at the CBC, he was president of his union local and in 1998 he was elected president of the National Radio Producers' Association.]]

He left the CBC to become a freelance journalist in Montreal, where he was a columnist for HOUR magazine, and the Montreal Gazette. Montreal Gazette. He won a National Newspaper Award for his Gazette columns in 1995.

He moved to Toronto in 1997, where he wrote city columns for the National Post, The Globe and Mail and "The Toronto Star". His columns focussed on the small details of daily life, with a particular focus on social housing, mental health issues, addictions, and poverty. His column about the eviction and subsequent death of a tenant in community housing led to a public inquiry and a series of reforms in the treatment of elderly tenants in community housing in Toronto.

Personal life
Joe Fiorito is married to Susan Mahoney. His son, Matt, is a punk musician in Vancouver.

Awards and Honours
1995 - National Newspaper Award for columns
2000 - Brassani Prize for Short Fiction
2001 - Acerbi Prize nomination 
2003 - Toronto Book Award for The Song Beneath the Ice
2010 - Al Gosling Award
2011 - R. Gordon Bell Award
2012 - Canadian Helen Keller Centre Award
2021 - The Kouhi Award

Bibliography

 Comfort Me with Apples (Nuage Editions, 1994 columns; updated McClelland & Stewart, 2000)
 Tango on the Main (Nuage Editions, 1996 columns) 
 The Closer We Are to Dying (McClelland & Stewart, 1999) - memoir 
The Song Beneath the Ice (M&S 2002 novel)
 Union Station (M&S 2006 non-fiction)
Rust Is A Form of Fire (Guernica Editions 2015 poetry)
The Life Crimes and Hard Times of Ricky Atkinson, Leader of the Dirty Tricks Gang (Exile Editions 2017 co-author)
City Poems (Exile Editions 2018 poetry)
'' All I Have Learned Is Where I Have Been (Signal Editions 2020 poetry)

References

1948 births
Canadian columnists
Canadian male novelists
21st-century Canadian novelists
Canadian memoirists
Writers from Thunder Bay
Toronto Star people
Living people
Canadian people of Italian descent
Canadian male essayists
21st-century Canadian essayists
21st-century Canadian male writers
21st-century memoirists
Canadian social commentators
Canadian male poets
21st-century Canadian poets